The Rani Bilashmoni Government Boys' High School is a secondary school in Gazipur, Bangladesh.

About
Rani Bilashmoni Government  Boys' High School was established in 1905. It is situated at the center of Gazipur City and near Bhawal Rajbari. The school was named after queen Rani Bilashmoni. It has passed more than 100 years. The education level started from 6th Grade up to Secondary School Certificate exam (S.S.C.). The school has an information exchange program with John Marshall Middle School in Wichita, Kansas.

Description
The establishment of Rani Bilashmoni Government Boys' High School has a historic background. It was a great initiative taken by Bhawal King Raja Rajendra Narayan to establish this school in 1905 after his wife’s name. Since then, by the efforts of the staff and students, the school has established itself as one of the best high school in the city of Gazipur. It was enlisted as a government school in April 1981. 

The school stands at the center of Joydebpur, Gazipur. The main school building is located on the western side of the ‘Rajbari Maidan’. Near to it are the District Commissioner's office and the District Judge Court. There is a separate office building opposite the main school building for official works. It also holds the Headmaster's office. The school holds classes from grade six to ten in two shifts. As one of the schools with better quality of teaching staff, the admission process is competitive. The school runs in two shifts. The morning shift starts from 7:00 a.m. and runs till 12:00 p.m. The day shift begins at 12:30 p.m. and ends at 5:00 p.m. About two thousand students are receiving education and acquiring academic and co-curricular skills in double shifts.

Uniforms 
White Shirt sealed with school's own monogram, navy blue pant, tie, full white cades, navy blue sweater. Wearing a school uniform is obligatory.

Student community 

As its first club for students community Sir Motiur Rahman suggested some of students to be active in this regard to unite all the students and opened a confederation named RBM Student Confederation. But it's inactive now. Authority is trying to get a new legacy contract.

References

External links
 Rani Bilashmoni Govt. Boys' High School - official website created by Rokib Uddin Ahmed
 Facebook page: https://www.facebook.com/rbmschool.net/info?tab=page_info

Schools in Gazipur District